Hugh McDowall Lawson (13 February 1912 – 23 March 1997) was a politician in the United Kingdom's short-lived Common Wealth Party, which was founded to contest parliamentary by-elections during World War II.

He was elected to the House of Commons as Member of Parliament (MP) for Skipton at a by-election in January 1944, then contested Harrow West in the 1945 general election, where he lost. Lawson later contested the Rushcliffe constituency in Nottinghamshire in 1950 for the Labour Party, but was not elected; he likewise was unsuccessful in standing for the King's Lynn seat in Norfolk in 1955.

His sister was Faith Lawson, a housing officer and campaigner, and chairman of the Pedestrians Association from 1991 to 1997.

References

Sources

External links
 

1912 births
1997 deaths
Common Wealth Party MPs
Labour Party (UK) parliamentary candidates
Members of the Parliament of the United Kingdom for English constituencies
UK MPs 1935–1945
Common Wealth Party